Jai Prakash Nishad is an Indian politician and a member of Legislative Assembly of Deoria, Uttar Pradesh of India. He represents the Rudrapur constituency of Uttar Pradesh and is a member of the Bhartiya Janata Party.

Political career
Nishad was MLA for three terms. Since 1991, he represents Rudrapur constituency as a member of Bhartiya Janata Party.
In first term 1991 (11th Legislative Assembly of Uttar Pradesh), elections he defeated Janata Dal candidate Ram Shankar Vidyarthi by a margin of 4,174 votes.

In second term 1996 (13th Legislative Assembly of Uttar Pradesh), elections he again defeated Ram Shankar Vidyarthi candidate of Bahujan Samaj Party by a margin of 9,161 votes.

In third term 2017 (17th Legislative Assembly of Uttar Pradesh), elections he defeated Indian National Congress candidate Akhilesh Pratap Singh by a margin of 26,789 votes.

Nishad got the ministries of Animal Husbandry and Fisheries, Estate Department, Urban land in Yogi Adityanath ministry.

Posts held

References

Bharatiya Janata Party politicians from Uttar Pradesh
People from Sambhal district
Living people
Yogi ministry
Uttar Pradesh MLAs 2017–2022
1960 births
Uttar Pradesh MLAs 2022–2027